Pseudarctos is a member of the extinct family Amphicyonidae of terrestrial carnivores belonging to the suborder Caniformia, which inhabited Eurasia in the Middle Miocene subepoch 16.9—11.1 Ma, existing for approximately .

Pseudarctos was named Schlosser in 1899 and was assigned to Amphicyonidae by Carroll (1988). It was the size of a large fox.

Fossil distribution
Pseudarctos has been uncovered in Tung Gur China, Sandberg, Slovakia, and Malartic, a la ferme Larrieu, France.

References

Bear dogs
Miocene carnivorans
Tortonian extinctions
Cenozoic mammals of Asia
Cenozoic mammals of Europe
Burdigalian first appearances
Prehistoric carnivoran genera